The 2016 MTV Video Music Awards were held on Sunday night, August 28, 2016 at 9:00–11:54pm EDT at Madison Square Garden in Manhattan. Adele's "Hello" was the most nominated video with seven categories. This marked the 33rd edition of the live broadcast. Beyoncé led all winners with nine awards. Rihanna received the Michael Jackson Video Vanguard Award after performing several medley numbers during the ceremony. Britney Spears marked her first performance at the awards show since the heavily criticized 2007 show nine years prior. Beyoncé won eight awards to bring her career total of wins to 25 VMAs, overtaking Madonna's previous record of 20 awards, making her the artist with the most wins in the history of the award show.

The ceremony was shown on multiple Viacom cable networks and through smart TV and mobile devices which allow access to MTV's TV Everywhere-authenticated live stream within their app (dependent upon provider), along with MTV's website and Facebook Live.

Compared to the previous year's show which had a lesser amount of Viacom networks simulcasting the ceremony, the 2016 ceremony's numbers showed a 35% drop across the measured networks carrying the ceremony, making it the lowest rated ceremony in MTV's 32-year history beating out 1996 and 2015, totalling a cumulative 6.5 million viewers (being later beaten by the 2017 edition), though the network also claimed substantial additional streaming viewership across MTV apps and Facebook Live. 3.3 million viewers saw the show via MTV.

Performances

Presenters

Pre-show
DJ Khaled – host
Charlamagne Tha God and Lizzo – co-hosts
Lizzo – presented Song of Summer

Main show
 Sean "Diddy" Combs — presented Best Hip-Hop Video
 Hailee Steinfeld — spoke about Best New Artist voting procedures
 Chance the Rapper — introduced Ariana Grande and Nicki Minaj
 Alicia Keys — presented Best Male Video
 Michael Phelps — introduced Future
 Kanye West — premiered "Fade" music video
 Naomi Campbell — introduced Rihanna's second performance
 Rita Ora and Ansel Elgort — introduced Nick Jonas and Ty Dolla $ign
 Serena Williams — introduced Beyoncé
 Bebe Rexha and Tove Lo — presented the winners of professional categories
 Jaden Smith and Shameik Moore — presented Best Collaboration Video
 Kim Kardashian — introduced Britney Spears and G-Eazy
 Simone Biles, Laurie Hernandez, Madison Kocian and Aly Raisman — presented Best Female Video
 Tracee Ellis Ross — introduced Rihanna's third performance
 Fifth Harmony — presented Best New Artist
 Alessia Cara and Troye Sivan — introduced The Chainsmokers and Halsey
 Jimmy Fallon — presented Video of the Year
 Mary J. Blige — introduced Rihanna's final performance
 Drake — presented the Video Vanguard Award to Rihanna

In addition, Keegan-Michael Key and Jordan Peele provided commentary throughout the show from a luxury box as characters @LizardSheeple and @TheShamester. DJ Khaled, Nicole Byer, and Jay Pharoah also provided insight and commentary throughout the broadcast.

Winners and nominees
This year's nominees were presented on July 26, 2016, on MTV's Facebook page live.

Winners are highlighted in Bold

Video of the Year
Beyoncé — "Formation"
 Adele — "Hello"
 Justin Bieber — "Sorry"
 Drake — "Hotline Bling"
 Kanye West — "Famous"

Best Male Video
Calvin Harris (featuring Rihanna) — "This Is What You Came For"
 Drake — "Hotline Bling"
 Bryson Tiller — "Don't"
 The Weeknd — "Can't Feel My Face"
 Kanye West — "Famous"

Best Female Video
Beyoncé — "Hold Up"
 Adele — "Hello"
 Ariana Grande — "Into You"
 Rihanna (featuring Drake) — "Work"
 Sia — "Cheap Thrills"

Best New Artist
DNCE
 Desiigner
 Zara Larsson
 Lukas Graham
 Bryson Tiller

Best Pop Video
Beyoncé — "Formation"
 Adele — "Hello"
 Justin Bieber — "Sorry"
 Alessia Cara — "Wild Things"
 Ariana Grande — "Into You"

Best Rock Video
Twenty One Pilots — "Heathens"
 All Time Low — "Missing You"
 Coldplay — "Adventure of a Lifetime"
 Fall Out Boy (featuring Demi Lovato) — "Irresistible"
 Panic! at the Disco — "Victorious"

Best Hip-Hop Video
Drake — "Hotline Bling"
 2 Chainz — "Watch Out"
 Chance the Rapper (featuring Saba) — "Angels"
 Desiigner — "Panda"
 Bryson Tiller — "Don't"

Best Electronic Video
Calvin Harris and Disciples — "How Deep Is Your Love"
 99 Souls (featuring Destiny's Child and Brandy) — "The Girl Is Mine"
 Afrojack — "SummerThing!"
 The Chainsmokers (featuring Daya) — "Don't Let Me Down"
 Mike Posner — "I Took a Pill in Ibiza"

Best Collaboration Video

Fifth Harmony (featuring Ty Dolla Sign) — "Work from Home"
 Beyoncé (featuring Kendrick Lamar) — "Freedom"
 Ariana Grande (featuring Lil Wayne) — "Let Me Love You"
 Calvin Harris (featuring Rihanna) — "This Is What You Came For"
 Rihanna (featuring Drake) — "Work"

Breakthrough Long Form Video
Beyoncé — Lemonade
 Justin Bieber — Purpose: The Movement
 Chris Brown — Royalty
 Florence + The Machine — The Odyssey
 Troye Sivan — Blue Neighbourhood Trilogy

Best Direction
Beyoncé — "Formation" (Director: Melina Matsoukas)
 Adele — "Hello" (Director: Xavier Dolan)
 David Bowie — "Lazarus" (Director: Johan Renck)
 Coldplay — "Up&Up" (Directors: Vania Heymann and Gal Muggia)
 Tame Impala — "The Less I Know the Better" (Director: Canada)

Best Choreography
Beyoncé — "Formation" (Choreographers: Chris Grant, JaQuel Knight and Dana Foglia)
 Beyoncé — "Sorry" (Choreographers: Chris Grant, JaQuel Knight, Dana Foglia, Anthony Burrell & Beyoncé Knowles Carter)
 Missy Elliott (featuring Pharrell) — "WTF (Where They From)" (Choreographer: Hi-Hat)
 FKA Twigs — M3LL155X (Choreographer: Aaron Sillis, Benjamin Milan, Kenrick Sandy and FKA Twigs)
 Florence + The Machine — "Delilah" (Choreographer: Holly Blakey)

Best Visual Effects
Coldplay — "Up&Up" (Visual Effects: Vania Heymann and GloriaFX)
 Adele — "Send My Love (To Your New Lover)" (Visual Effects: Jonathan Box and MPC)
 FKA Twigs — M3LL155X (Visual Effects: Lewis Saunders and Jihoon Yoo)
 The Weeknd — "Can't Feel My Face" (Visual Effects: Louis Mackall and T.J. Burke)
 Zayn — "Pillowtalk" (Visual Effects: David Smith)

Best Art Direction
David Bowie — "Blackstar" (Art Director: Jan Houllevigue)
 Adele — "Hello" (Art Director: Colombe Raby)
 Beyoncé — "Hold Up" (Art Director: Jason Hougaard)
 Drake — "Hotline Bling" (Art Director: Jeremy MacFarlane)
 Fergie — "M.I.L.F. $" (Art Director: Alexander Delgado)

Best Editing
Beyoncé — "Formation" (Editor: Jeff Selis)
 Adele — "Hello" (Editor: Xavier Dolan)
 David Bowie — "Lazarus" (Editor: Johan Söderberg)
 Fergie — "M.I.L.F. $" (Editor: Vinnie Hobbs)
 Ariana Grande — "Into You" (Editor: Hannah Lux Davis)

Best Cinematography
 Beyoncé — "Formation" (Director of Photography: Malik Sayeed) 
 Adele — "Hello" (Director of Photography: André Turpin)
 Alesso — "I Wanna Know" (Director of Photography: Corey Jennings)
 David Bowie — "Lazarus" (Director of Photography: Crille Forsberg)
 Ariana Grande — "Into You" (Director of Photography: Paul Laufer)

Song of Summer
Fifth Harmony (featuring Fetty Wap) — "All in My Head (Flex)"
 The Chainsmokers (featuring Halsey) — "Closer"
 Drake (featuring Kyla and Wizkid) — "One Dance"
 Selena Gomez — "Kill Em with Kindness"
 Calvin Harris (featuring Rihanna) — "This Is What You Came For"
 Nick Jonas (featuring Ty Dolla Sign) — "Bacon"
 Kent Jones — "Don't Mind"
 Major Lazer (featuring Justin Bieber and MØ) — "Cold Water"
 Sia — "Cheap Thrills"
 Justin Timberlake — "Can't Stop the Feeling!"

Michael Jackson Video Vanguard Award
Rihanna

See also
 2016 MTV Europe Music Awards

References

External links
Official website

MTV Video Music
MTV Video Music Awards
MTV Video Music
MTV Video Music Awards
MTV Video Music Awards
MTV Video Music Awards ceremonies